Lost City in Snow Heaven, also known as Xue Yu Mi Cheng, is a 2005 Chinese fantasy-action television series directed by Lai Shui-ching, Yu Ming-sang and Yang Zhiqian, starring Vincent Zhao and Ning Jing in the leading roles. There is also a movie called “Lost City In Snow Heaven”. However, though 'Lost City In Snow Heaven' is marketed as a movie, it is in fact a scaled-down version of the Chinese television series.

Plot
Eighteen years ago, the last battle in an era of witchcraft and sorcery took place. The Emperor leads his army to invade the Hanhai tribe in the desert in an attempt to pave a road for his conquest of the southern territories. To prevent the invaders from gaining ground, Yeyue, Hanhai's head priestess, has no choice but to use the power of the Dark Chalice to summon forth the spirits of the dead soldiers of Hanhai to defend their homeland. Yeyue succeeds in her plan but loses control of the Dark Chalice. The Emperor breaks into the shrine where the Dark Chalice is held and experiences a vision of his younger brother, Chongguang, rebelling against him and seizing control of his empire. Yeyue, on the other hand, sees that Emperor's wife will give birth to a baby girl. The Emperor's wife orders her close aide Yang An to bring the infant princess Leng Yun to Snow City to escape from Chongguang's pursuit.
Leng Yun grows up to find that she has magical healing powers thanks to the gift of calling upon butterfly-pixies.

Cast
 Vincent Zhao as Lei Ou
 Ning Jing as Leng Yun
 Liu Dekai as Emperor Chongguang
 Shi Yanfei as Wuyang
 Allen Ting as Nalong
 Bao Jianfeng as Najialuo
 Kou Zhenhai as Ke'erte leader
 Zhang Danlu as Cuixin
 Yue Yueli as Chief Pang
 Xu Shouqin as Dibao
 Du Ninglin as Empress Dowager
 Jiang Hong as Die'er
 Wu Yijiang as Xin Da
 Du Jian as Nima
 Chae Rim as Empress
 Wu Ma as Yang An
 Zhang Hengping as Gaya

External links
  Lost City in Snow Heaven on Sina.com

2005 Chinese television series debuts
Chinese fantasy television series
Chinese action television series
Mandarin-language television shows